Salt Rock Township is one of the fifteen townships of Marion County, Ohio, United States.  The 2010 census found 673 people in the township, 399 of whom lived in the village of Morral.

Geography
Located in the northern part of the county, it borders the following townships:
Pitt Township, Wyandot County - north
Antrim Township, Wyandot County - northeast corner
Grand Prairie Township - east
Marion Township - southeast corner
Big Island Township - south
Montgomery Township - southwest corner
Grand Township - west
Marseilles Township, Wyandot County - northwest

The village of Morral is located in northeastern Salt Rock Township.

Name and history
It is the only Salt Rock Township statewide.

Government
The township is governed by a three-member board of trustees, who are elected in November of odd-numbered years to a four-year term beginning on the following January 1. Two are elected in the year after the presidential election and one is elected in the year before it. There is also an elected township fiscal officer, who serves a four-year term beginning on April 1 of the year after the election, which is held in November of the year before the presidential election. Vacancies in the fiscal officership or on the board of trustees are filled by the remaining trustees.

Notable residents
John Purdue 1802–1876, born in Huntingdon County, Pennsylvania. He was a famous industrialist based in Lafayette, Indiana and the primary original benefactor of Purdue University.

References

External links
County website

Townships in Marion County, Ohio
Townships in Ohio